Camac or CAMAC may refer to:

 CAMAC Energy, United States-based oil and gas company
 Camac Street, Kolkata, India
 Computer Automated Measurement and Control
 River Camac, Dublin, Ireland
 Robert W. Camac (1940–2001), American racehorse trainer